The East Portland Branch, Public Library of Multnomah County housed part of the library system of Multnomah County, Oregon, from 1911 to 1967. Designed by architect A. E. Doyle, the structure was completed in 1911 in Portland at 1110 Southeast Alder Street in the city's central eastside. Funded in part by the Carnegie Foundation, the original building consisted of one floor and a daylight basement and included reading rooms for children and adults. The building had a red brick exterior, terra-cotta trim, and a roof of green Spanish tiles.

From 1864 until 1902, Portland had subscription libraries that were open to the public, but it had no tax-supported public library. In 1902, the library system became tax-supported, free, and open to all Portland residents. A year later, it was opened to all residents of Multnomah County. Within months of the change from subscription library to free public library, the number of users grew from 1,000 members to 8,000 registered borrowers.

The subscription libraries had reading rooms only in downtown Portland. To accommodate the growing number of users, the new library established reading rooms in other parts of the city. By 1907, it had neighborhood branches in Sellwood, Albina, and the central eastside neighborhood. Doyle designed a small temporary building for the eastside branch before money became available for the permanent structure.

References

External links
 

1911 establishments in Oregon
A. E. Doyle buildings
Buckman, Portland, Oregon
Carnegie libraries in Oregon
Former library buildings in the United States
Libraries established in 1911
Libraries on the National Register of Historic Places in Oregon
Library buildings completed in 1911
Multnomah County Library
National Register of Historic Places in Portland, Oregon
Portland Historic Landmarks
1967 disestablishments in Oregon